Atlanta oligogyra is a species of sea snail, a holoplanktonic marine gastropod mollusk in the family Atlantidae.

Description

Distribution

References

External links

Atlantidae
Gastropods described in 1806